Loving You (also known as The Rainbow Room) is a British television crime drama film, based upon the novel Trust by Margaret Leroy, first broadcast on ITV on 24 February  2003. The film was adapted from the novel by writer Matthew Hall and was directed by Jean Stewart. The film stars Niamh Cusack as Chloe, a divorced schoolteacher who falls in love with educational psychologist Dan (Douglas Henshall), only to be left heartbroken when the police arrest Dan on suspicion of sexually abusing a six-year-old that he has been assessing. Chloe is forced to confront the possibility that Dan may have also sexually abused her two daughters, Alice (Ophelia Lovibond) and Lucy (Maisie Preston).

Additional cast members for the film include Keith Allen, who plays Chloe's ex-husband Adam, and Marian McLoughlin and Mark Bonnar, who play the officers investigating Dan, DS Vicky Griggs and DC Colin Morris. The film was broadcast in Finland in July 2004, and in Brazil under the title Verdade Sob Suspeita. Margaret Leroy praised Matthew Hall's adaptation, writing; "I was delighted when Granada bought the television rights to Trust. During filming I spent a day on set. It was fascinating to see how my story had grown from a tiny seed of an idea into this project involving so many people - and it was quite a thrill to walk round the set and see the rooms of Chloe's house exactly as I'd imagined them." The film attracted an audience of 7.41 million viewers in the 9:00pm slot. Notably, the film has never been repeated, nor released on DVD.

Cast
 Niamh Cusack as Chloe
 Douglas Henshall as Dan
 Marianne Jean-Baptiste as Jude
 Keith Allen as Adam
 Marian McLoughlin as DS Vicky Griggs
 Mark Bonnar as DC Colin Morris
 Paterson Joseph as Felix Fisher
 Jennifer Hennessy as Mrs. Smithson
 Alan McKenna as John
 Ophelia Lovibond as Alice
 Maisie Preston as Lucy
 Jean Marie Coffey as Sue
 Ashley Clish as Jessica
 Lauren Reid as Charlene
 Emily May Sissons as Carly
 Steven Webb as Justin
 Polly Kemp as Social Worker
 Charles De'Ath as Prosecutor
 Jerome Willis as Magistrate

References

External links

2003 television films
2003 films
British television films
British crime films
ITV television dramas
Television series by ITV Studios
Television shows produced by Granada Television
Films shot in the United Kingdom
Films scored by Nicholas Hooper
2000s English-language films
2000s British films